Children of the Fleet is a science fiction novel by American writer Orson Scott Card. The title of the novel (and the series Fleet School) was announced by the author on 12 November 2015, and it was released on October 10, 2017.

Synopsis

The series is set after Ender's Game and is set in Battle School, which has been renamed to Fleet School, a school run by Hyrum Graff where kids learn how to become commanders of the colonies they will lead and form on other planets. The protagonist and lead character is 10-year-old Dabeet Ochoa.

Potential film
Gavin Hood, director of the Ender's Game film, stated that if a sequel were to happen it could potentially be the first book in the Fleet School series, Children of the Fleet. There are currently no plans for a sequel.

Reception
The book received positive reviews by Deseret News, Publishers Weekly, RT Book Reviews and Den of Geek. Forbes called it "Orson Scott Card's best since Ender's Game". It had a rating of 3.63 out of 5 on Goodreads as of December 2017.

See also

 Ender's Game series
 List of Ender's Game characters

References

2017 American novels
2017 science fiction novels
American science fiction novels
American young adult novels
Ender's Game series books
Novels set in schools
Tor Books books